George John Dorling (27 July 1918 – October 1987) was an English professional footballer who played as a full back.

Career
Born in Edmonton, London, Wilson played professionally for Tottenham Hotspur and Gillingham. He made over 100 appearances for the "Gills".

References

1918 births
1987 deaths
Footballers from Edmonton, London
English footballers
Northfleet United F.C. players
Tottenham Hotspur F.C. players
Gillingham F.C. players
Snowdown Colliery Welfare F.C. players
English Football League players
Association football defenders